Roșia is a commune located in Sibiu County, Transylvania, Romania. It is composed of six villages: Cașolț, Cornățel, Daia (formerly Daia Săsească), Nou, Nucet, and Roșia.

Roșia village is the site of Roșia fortified church.

History 

In 1910, the Agnita to Sibiu railway line was completed, with stations at Roșia, Cașolț and Cornățel; the line was closed in 2001. An active restoration group has since been formed aiming to restore the entire line to working condition.

Natives 

 Ion Gorun

References 

Communes in Sibiu County
Localities in Transylvania